Lucrezia Barberini (24 October 1628 – 24 August 1699) was an Italian noblewoman and, by marriage, Duchess of Modena. Born into the Barberini family, she was the last wife of Francesco I d'Este, Duke of Modena.

Biography

Barberini was born 24 October 1628; the eldest of five children to Taddeo Barberini, Prince of Palestrina and his wife Anna Colonna, a daughter of Filippo Colonna, Prince of Paliano. She was the sister of Maffeo Barberini and Cardinal Carlo Barberini and the Grand-Niece of Pope Urban VIII. Her uncles included three Cardinals; Francesco Barberini, Antonio Barberini and Girolamo Colonna.

Her cousin Lorenzo Onofrio Colonna, Prince of Paliano, was the husband of Marie Mancini; niece of French First Minister Cardinal Jules Mazarin.

On 14 October 1654 she married Francesco I d'Este, Duke of Modena and was the mother of Rinaldo d'Este who succeeded nephew as Duke of Modena. The couple married in Loreto, Marche at the Basilica della Santa Casa. In many ways the marriage represented a long-overdue truce between the House of Este and the House of Barberini who had taken sides against each other during the First War of Castro. Francesco had, in fact, fought alongside his father against Taddeo Barberini's troops.

They had one son, Rinaldo d'Este, Duke of Modena, who married Charlotte of Brunswick-Lüneburg. Through this child, she is ancestor of the royal house of Austria-Este.

References

1628 births
1699 deaths
House of Este
Lucrezia
Lucrezia
Lucrezia
17th-century Italian nobility
17th-century Italian women